is a Japanese rugby sevens player. He scored the first try in their upset against New Zealand at the Olympics.

References

External links
 
 JRFU Player Profile

1991 births
Living people
People from Yamanashi Prefecture
Sportspeople from Yamanashi Prefecture
Male rugby sevens players
Rugby sevens players at the 2016 Summer Olympics
Olympic rugby sevens players of Japan
Japanese rugby sevens players
Japanese rugby union players
Green Rockets Tokatsu players
Japan international rugby sevens players
Sunwolves players
Rugby union wings